Haus am See (German for House by the Lake) is a song released in 2008 by German musician Peter Fox. It was the second single of his only studio album Stadtaffe and reached number eight in Germany.

Charts

Weekly charts

Year-end charts

Certifications

References

2008 singles
2008 songs
Songs written by Peter Fox (musician)
Warner Records singles